English indie rock band The Maccabees released four studio albums, two extended plays, and eleven singles from 2004 until their disbandment in 2017.

Albums

Studio albums

EPs

Singles

Notes

References

Discographies of British artists
Rock music group discographies